Pete Sinclair is a writer who has worked on British television and radio series such as All Along the Watchtower, Have I Got News for You, Lead Balloon, and Spitting Image. Much of his writing has been in the genres of comedy and political satire. He created the ITV sitcom Bad Move with Jack Dee in 2017.

Credits

Television
 Bad Move (2017)
 Power Monkeys (2016)
 Have I Got News for You (2016)
 Ballot Monkeys (2015)
 Newzoids (2015)
 Alexander Armstrong's Big Ask (2013)
 Lead Balloon (2006)
 The Mark Steel Lectures (2006)
 Mike Bassett: Manager (2005)
 My Hero (2003)
 Mr Charity (2001)
 You Only Live Once (2000)
 All Along the Watchtower (1999)
 Never Mind the Buzzcocks (1996)
 Room 101 (1994)
 Clive Anderson Talks Back (1989)
 The Rory Bremner Show (1988)
 Spitting Image (1987)
 Carrott Confidential (1987)
 Now, Something Else (1986)

Radio
 Loose Ends (1998)
 A Look Back at the Nineties (1993)
 The Mark Steel Solution (1992)
 Unnatural Acts (1987)

References

External links
 

20th-century British writers
21st-century British writers
British comedy writers
British male screenwriters
British radio writers
British television writers
Place of birth missing (living people)
Year of birth missing (living people)
20th-century British male writers
21st-century British male writers
Living people
British male television writers